Tasslielink Transit is a bus and coach operator in Hobart and Launceston, Tasmania.

History
In July 1987 Melbourne based Invicta Bus Services purchased the business of Morse's Bus Service, Devonport. This was sold in 1990.

The businesses of Tag Along Tours, Hobart, and Mountain Stage Line, Launceston along with a Devonport to Cradle Mountain service were purchased. These were combined under the Tasmanian Wilderness Travel brand.

In 1997 TRC Travel was purchased. In 1999 the Port Arthur, West Coast, East Coast and Huonville services were purchased from Tigerline. In October 2005 the service between Cressy, Longford and Launceston was purchased.

Fleet
As at November 2022 the fleet consisted of 44 buses and coaches.

Depot
Tassielink Transit operate out of a depot in Derwent Park.

References

External links
Company website

Bus companies of Tasmania
Transport companies established in 1991
Transport in Tasmania
1991 establishments in Australia